Kulpa is a village and Gram-panchayat in Lanji block of Balaghat district in Madhya pradesh. Kulpa is situated in the border of two states (Madhya pradesh and Maharashtra). Kulpa is 25 km from sub-district headquarters and 84 km from District headquarters.

References 

Villages in Balaghat district